Lucy Mary Hope Jarvis (July 27, 1896 – May 24, 1985) was a Canadian painter and educator.

The daughter of Edward William Jarvis and Kate Agnes Harris, she was born in Toronto and grew up in Yarmouth,  Pembroke Shore (Nova Scotia), Fredericton and southwestern Ontario. Jarvis studied art at Havergal Ladies College and at the art school of the Boston Museum of Fine Arts.

She taught at Kings Hall in Compton, Quebec and at the Provincial Normal School in Fredericton. She worked as a cataloguer and draftsman for the Royal Ontario Museum. From 1942 to 1944, she showed films in rural New Brunswick for the National Film Board War Information Service. With Pegi Nicol MacLeod, Jarvis founded the Observatory Art Centre of the University of New Brunswick. From 1946 to 1960, she was director of the art department at the University of New Brunswick. Jarvis later received a fellowship from the Canada Council which allowed her to travel and study in Europe.

In 1961, she established a studio at Pembroke Dyke. Jarvis died there at the age of 88.

Her work is included in the collections of the University of New Brunswick, the Beaverbrook Art Gallery, the New Brunswick Museum, the University of Toronto and the National Gallery of Canada. Jarvis worked in pastels, watercolours and oil.

References

Sources 
Rosenfeld, Roslyn Margaret, Lucy Jarvis even stones have life. Fredericton, New Brunswick: Goose Lane Editions, 2016. Print.

1896 births
1985 deaths
20th-century Canadian painters
Canadian watercolourists
Canadian women painters
Artists from Toronto
School of the Museum of Fine Arts at Tufts alumni
Academic staff of the University of New Brunswick
Women watercolorists
20th-century Canadian women artists